Mesbahiyya Madrasa is a madrasa in Fes el Bali, the old medina quarter in the city of Fez, Morocco. The madrasa was completed in 1346, during the Marinid period, under the patronage of the Marinid sultan Abu al-Hasan who was a prolific constructor of madrasas in the city. It is located next to the University of al-Qarawiyyin.

Description
The madrasa owes its name to the faqih (Islamic jurist) Al-Mesbahi, the first faqih who taught in the madrasa. It was distinguished by the white marble used in its construction and decoration, which was imported by Abu al-Hassan from the city of Almeria in al-Andalus (Spain). The extensive use of the marble gave the madrasa its nickname Madrasa ar-Rkham, meaning "school of marble". Centered around a courtyard, the building originally consisted of a ground floor and three upper floors, but the top floor has since been destroyed. On the north side of the courtyard is a large twin-arched opening leading to a square prayer hall. The twin-arched entrance is unique in the context of Marinid architecture and is richly decorated with carved stucco, including a cursive Arabic inscription running in a frame around it. Despite its function, the prayer hall lacks a mihrab. The madrasa could house around 140 students from across the country in 117 rooms across its different floors.

State of preservation 
The madrasa has been severely damaged and elements of it have collapsed over time due to neglect and to poor restoration attempts. The dome of the prayer room, the ceiling of the ablutions room, and some other rooms were destroyed, and the iconic marbles have also deteriorated. However, it still retains valuable elements of Marinid motifs and original forms of floral and geometric decorations, and has been undergoing the restoration initiated in the early 1990s. The restoration was finally completed as of 2017 in the context of a wider restoration program for other madrasas and historic monuments in the city. Upon completion of the restoration, the madrasa was earmarked to serve the Qarawiyyin University.

References

Buildings and structures in Fez, Morocco
Madrasas in Morocco
Marinid architecture
Religious buildings and structures completed in 1346